Aftertaste is an Australian television comedy series on ABC TV, first airing on 3 February 2021. It is created by Julie De Fina and Matthew Bate, produced by Closer Productions. The first season was directed by Jonathan Brough, and the second, airing from 20 July 2022, by Renée Webster.

Plot summary
The series revolves around Easton West, an internationally renowned, yet volatile celebrity chef who has a spectacular fall from grace and returns to his hometown in the Adelaide Hills. He endeavours to rebuild his career and restore his reputation, with the help of his talented, young, pastry-chef niece Diana.

Cast

Season 1
 Erik Thomson as Easton West
 Natalie Abbott as Diana
 Rachel Griffiths as Margot
 Wayne Blair as Brett
 Susan Prior as Denise
 Peter Carroll as Jim
 Remy Hii as Ben Zhao
 Kavitha Anandasivam as Nayani
 Justin Amankwah as Kwame
 Matt Vesely, as Max

Season 2
Most of the Season 1 cast, as well as:
 Lynette Curran as June 
 Julian Maroun as Harry 
 Syd Brisbane as Terry 
 Lisa Flanagan as Tammy
 Chrissie Page as Pastor Penny

Episodes

Series Overview

Season 1 (2021)

Season 2 (2022)

Production
Aftertaste was produced by Closer Productions for the Australian Broadcasting Corporation. The ABC provided the majority of financing with Screen Australia and the South Australian Film Corporation (SAFC) also being significant sources of finance. The series was made during the COVID-19 pandemic in Australia, which required the navigation of additional obstacles. SAFC offered business resilience training and other help to the Closer Productions Team.

The producers were Rebecca Summerton, Matthew Bate and Erik Thomson, while Julie De Fina was executive producer.  The series was created by De Fina and Bate; it was written by De Fina, Bate and Matt Vesely. The executive producer for the ABC was Rebecca Anderson.

Jonathan Brough, who directed Rosehaven and The Family Law, directed the first season of the series.

In November 2021 it was announced that a second series had been commissioned by the ABC, which was being filmed in early 2022, directed by Renée Webster. Filming was completed in March.

While season one centred on the small town of Uraidla, east of the city of Adelaide, and was filmed on location around there, the second series was filmed in a more southerly part of the Adelaide Hills, between Kangarilla and Meadows.

Release

The series first premiered on 3 February 2021 on the ABC TV channel.

The second season of the series goes to air on 20 July 2022.

Worldwide distribution 
ABC Commercial has international distribution rights, and in February 2022 sold the first series to US streaming service Acorn TV, for release in the US, UK, Ireland, Netherlands, Spain, Portugal, and Canada. Season 1 is also available in French and Spanish.

Reception
In a review of the first two episodes, The Guardian called it a "sharp satire" that's "smart, dynamic and laugh-out-loud funny". Broadsheet  called it a "very, very funny show", which incorporates important themes while remaining "delightfully silly and vulgar television". Graeme Blundell, in The Australian, called the writing "polished and witty", the direction achieving "the right density of texture and atmosphere", and especially praised newcomer Abbott's performance.

References

Further reading

External links

Australian Broadcasting Corporation original programming
Australian comedy television series
2021 Australian television series debuts
Television shows set in South Australia
English-language television shows